Robert Hillis Jr. (born September 10, 1961) is an American professional stock car racing driver. He has been a longtime competitor in NASCAR's West Series, currently known as the ARCA Menards Series West. For the vast majority of his starts, he has driven for his team, Hillis Racing, also sometimes known as Fierce Creature Racing. Hillis made two starts in the NASCAR Craftsman Truck Series in 2000 as well.

Racing career

Personal life

When Hillis uses the No. 0, he puts a small-sized less than symbol to the left of the number to symbolize that his team is underfunded and has a budget that looks like it is less than zero. Also, in races where he drives a Toyota Camry, he tends to cover up the word "Camry" on the nose to say "Kamree", which is the name of his daughter.

Motorsports career results

NASCAR
(key) (Bold – Pole position awarded by qualifying time. Italics – Pole position earned by points standings or practice time. * – Most laps led.)

Craftsman Truck Series

ARCA Menards Series
(key) (Bold – Pole position awarded by qualifying time. Italics – Pole position earned by points standings or practice time. * – Most laps led.)

ARCA Menards Series West

 Season still in progress

References

External links
 

Living people
1961 births
Racing drivers from Phoenix, Arizona
NASCAR drivers
ARCA Menards Series drivers